Wendell A. Mordy (April 28, 1920July 14, 2002) was an American atmospheric physicist. He was the founding director of the Desert Research Institute in Reno, Nevada.

Early life
Mordy was born on April 28, 1920, in Rock Island, Illinois. He attended Pomona College, graduating in 1942, and then obtained a doctorate from Stockholm University in 1958. He served as a commanding officer of a U.S. Army Air Forces meteorological detachment in Europe during World War II.

Career

Mordy initially became well known as a leading authority on cloud-seeding techniques. In 1960, he became the founding director of the Desert Research Institute, a position in which he served until 1969. He subsequently became the director of the Sea Grant Institute of the University of Miami and president of the Science Museum of Minnesota. He also served as the founding president of the International Space Theater Consortium, helping to pioneer 360-degree video projection systems.

Personal life
Mordy married Brooke Davis on November 30, 1942. He had two daughters.

Retirement and death
Mordy died on July 14, 2002.

References

External links
Wendall A. Mordy papers at Iowa State University

American atmospheric scientists
Pomona College alumni
Stockholm University alumni
1920 births
2002 deaths
United States Army Air Forces personnel of World War II
American expatriates in Sweden